The 2011–12 Pro12 League (also known as the RaboDirect Pro12 for sponsorship reasons) was the 11th season of the rugby union competition originally known as the Celtic League, the second with its current 12-team format, and also the first with RaboDirect as title sponsor.

The twelve teams competing were the four Irish provinces, Munster, Leinster, Connacht and Ulster; two Scottish regions, Edinburgh Rugby and Glasgow Warriors; four Welsh regions, Cardiff Blues, Newport Gwent Dragons, Ospreys and Scarlets; and two Italian clubs Aironi and Benetton Treviso.

The competition was won by Ospreys, who defeated Leinster in the final 31–30.

Teams

Table

Fixtures
All times are local.

Round 1

Round 2

Round 3

Round 4

Round 5

Round 6

Round 7

Round 8

Round 9

Round 10

Round 11

1872 Cup 1st round

Round 12

1872 Cup 2nd round

Round 13

Round 14

Round 15

Round 16

Round 17

Rearranged fixtures

Round 18

Round 19

Round 20

Round 21

Round 22

Playoffs

Semi-finals

Final

Leading scorers
Note: Flags to the left of player names indicate national team as has been defined under IRB eligibility rules, or primary nationality for players who have not yet earned international senior caps. Players may hold one or more non-IRB nationalities.

Top points scorers

Top try scorers

2011/2012 Dream Team

Broadcasting rights

Setanta Sports Australia broadcasts live RaboDirect Pro12 matches in Australia.
Setanta Sports Asia broadcast live RaboDirect Pro12 matches in Asia also.

Notes

References

External links
Official Site
2011–12 Celtic League at ESPN

   
     
2011-12
2011–12 in Irish rugby union
2011–12 in Welsh rugby union
2011–12 in Scottish rugby union
2011–12 in Italian rugby union